The year 577 BC was a year of the pre-Julian Roman calendar. In the Roman Empire, it was known as year 177 Ab urbe condita . The denomination 577 BC for this year has been used since the early medieval period, when the Anno Domini calendar era became the prevalent method in Europe for naming years.

Events

September or October (3rd of Tishrey): Gedaliah, son of Achikam, murdered by Ishmael, son of Kerach in Mizpa, Judea (Babylonian Empire).

Births
 Emperor Annei of Japan (d. 510 BC)

Deaths
 Duke Huan of Qin, Chinese ruler

References